Doumea reidi is a species of catfish in the genus Doumea. It lives in the Mbam River in Nigeria. Its length reaches 9.3 cm.

References 

Amphiliidae
Freshwater fish of Africa
Fish described in 2010